Brega e Chique is a 1987 Brazilian telenovela created by Cassiano Gabus Mendes, and starring Gloria Menezes and Marília Pêra.

Plot 
From opposite worlds, Rosemere da Silva (Glória Menezes) and Rafaela Alvaray (Marília Pêra) have their stories crossed because of Herbert Alvaray, a businessman from São Paulo, married to both.

Cast

References

External links 
 Brega e Chique at Memória Globo

1987 telenovelas
Brazilian telenovelas
Portuguese-language telenovelas
TV Globo telenovelas
1987 Brazilian television series debuts
1987 Brazilian television series endings
Polygamy in fiction